George Anson (25 July 1731 – 27 October 1789), known as George Adams until 1773, was a Staffordshire landowner from the Anson family and a British Whig politician who sat in the House of Commons between 1761 and 1769.

Background
Anson was the son of Sambrooke Adams and his wife Janette Anson, who was the daughter of William Anson and the sister of the naval commander Admiral George Anson, 1st Baron Anson, and the dilettante Thomas Anson.

Public life
As George Adams, Anson was elected Member of Parliament for Saltash when his uncle died in 1761, a seat he held until 1768.
He was returned to Parliament as one of two representatives for Lichfield in 1770, a seat he held until his death. In 1773, on the death of his uncle Thomas Anson he succeeded to the Anson estates, including the family seat of Shugborough Hall. He assumed by sign manual the surname and arms of Anson.

Family
Anson married Mary Venables-Vernon, of Sudbury Hall, daughter of George Venables-Vernon, 1st Baron Vernon, in 1763. She was sister to Edward Venables-Vernon-Harcourt, Archbishop of York, and a descendant the Dukes of Norfolk.  Anson died in October 1789, aged 58.

Several of their children gained distinction:

 Thomas Anson (1767–1818) was elevated to the peerage as Viscount Anson in 1806 and was the father of Thomas Anson, 1st Earl of Lichfield, and of Major-General George Anson 
 Sir George Anson (1769–1849) was an army general and colonel of the 4th Dragoon Guards, Equerry to Victoria, Duchess of Kent, and Groom of the Bedchamber to Prince Albert.  His son Talavera Vernon Anson joined the Royal Navy and became an admiral.
 Charles Anson (1770–1827) Archdeacon of Carlisle.
 Sir William Anson, 1st Baronet (1772–1847), was an army general who served in the Peninsular War and was created a baronet (see Anson Baronets) in 1831.
 Sambrooke Anson (1778–1846) became Lt-Colonel in command of the 1st Foot Guards throughout the Peninsula Campaign.
 Frederick Anson, D.D. (1779–1867), became Dean of Chester. He married Mary Anne Levett, daughter of Reverend Richard Levett of nearby Milford Hall, in 1807. Father of George Edward Anson and Frederick Anson. 
 Mary Anson (died 1837) married in 1785 Sir Francis Ford, Bt., and died in 1837.
 Anne Anson (died 1822) married in 1792 Bell Lloyd of Crogan, younger brother to the Edward Lloyd, 1st Baron Mostyn, and was mother to William H. C. Lloyd, Archdeacon of Durban.

References

 George Anson (thePeerage.com)
 Burke's Peerage Baronetage & Knightage, 107th Edition

1731 births
1789 deaths
Members of the Parliament of Great Britain for constituencies in Cornwall
British MPs 1761–1768
British MPs 1768–1774
British MPs 1774–1780
British MPs 1780–1784
British MPs 1784–1790
Whig members of the Parliament of Great Britain
George